The Starlight Express is an express bus service operating between New York City and the Central Virginia city of Charlottesville. It makes three weekly runs in each direction. Like Amtrak, it typically requires about six and a half hours to make the trip.

History
Two Charlottesville-based businessmen inaugurated this service in 2004 to fill a perceived service gap and chose a name meant to evoke the luxury of storied trains such as the 20th Century Limited and the Orient Express. 
They were root beer company founder David New and outspoken developer Oliver Kuttner, and they launched with a single repurposed Greyhound bus body outfitted with leather BMW seats and charged $99 each way. Kuttner and New sold the company in 2010.

Today
In recent years, with the state-subsidized expansion of Amtrak's Northeast Regional train service, the Starlight Express has become known as much for its economical fares as for actual luxury. The new owner lowered the fares to range from $50–70. Like many express buses and Chinatown bus lines, the Starlight has a restroom on board as well as complimentary snacks and drinks, as the driver typically is the sole company official on board and must keep attention fixed on the road. Frequent riders appear to be local citizens and students at the nearby University of Virginia.

References

External links
 Starlightbus.com 

Intercity bus companies of the United States
Transport companies established in 2004
Transportation companies based in Virginia